Cheaney is a surname. Notable people with the name include:

Calbert Cheaney (born 1971), American basketball player and coach
Joe Bailey Cheaney (1902–1983), American football and basketball coach

See also
Chaney, surname
Cheney (surname)